Repere Transilvane ("Transylvanian Highlights") was a Romanian weekly literary and political magazine, issued by the Radio Transilvania. It was a bilingual publication, in Romanian, and Hungarian. The first edition was printed on May 4, 1999.

Footnotes

External links
  Új román-magyar lap Zilahon
  A romániai magyar kisebbség történeti kronológiája 1990-2003

Defunct literary magazines published in Europe
Bilingual magazines
Defunct magazines published in Romania
Hungarian-language magazines
Literary magazines published in Romania
Magazines established in 1999
Magazines disestablished in 2000
Mass media in Zalău
Magazines in Transylvania
Political magazines published in Romania
Romanian-language magazines
1999 establishments in Romania